Bursera is a census town in the Chandrapura CD block in the Bermo subdivision of the Bokaro district in the Indian state of Jharkhand.

Geography

Location                  

Bursera is not marked in Google maps. The location given here is as per the Map of Chandrapura CD block on page 74 of District Census Handbook 2011, Bokaro.

Area overview
Bokaro district consists of undulating uplands on the Chota Nagpur Plateau with the Damodar River cutting a valley right across. The East Bokaro Coalfield located in the Bermo-Phusro area and small intrusions of Jharia Coalfield make Bokaro a coal rich district. In 1965, one of the largest steel manufacturing units in the country, Bokaro Steel Plant, operated by Steel Authority of India Limited, was set-up at Bokaro Steel City. The Damodar Valley Corporation established its first thermal power station at Bokaro (Thermal). The soil is generally infertile and agriculture is mostly rain-fed.

Note: The map alongside presents some of the notable locations in the district. All places marked in the map are linked in the larger full screen map.

Demographics
According to the 2011 Census of India, Bursera had a total population of 4,070, of which 2,108(52%) were males and 1,962 (48%) were females. Population in the age range 0-6 years was 599. The total number of literate persons in Bursera was 2,316 (66.72% of the population over 6 years).

Infrastructure
According to the District Census Handbook 2011, Bokaro, Bursera covered an area of 4.95 km2. Among the civic amenities, it had 7 km roads with both open and close drains, the protected water supply involved hand pump, uncovered well. It had 679 domestic electric connections, x road lighting points. Among the medical facilities, it had 6 hospitals, 4 dispensaries, 4 health centres, 6 family welfare centres, 9 maternity and child welfare centres, 6 maternity homes, 6 nursing homes, no medicine shop. Among the educational facilities it had 2 primary schools, 1 middle school, the nearest secondary, senior secondary school at Dugda 7 km away.

References

Cities and towns in Bokaro district